Jabez Reeves Farmstead is a historic home and farm and national historic district located in Center Township, Rush County, Indiana.  The Reeves-Hodson House was built about 1855, and is two-story, brick I-house with Greek Revival and Italianate style design elements. It features segmental arched windows and simple brackets under a wide eave.  Also on the property are the contributing windmill, brick smokehouse (c. 1855), and large English barn.

It was listed on the National Register of Historic Places in 1989.

References

Historic districts on the National Register of Historic Places in Indiana
Farms on the National Register of Historic Places in Indiana
Houses completed in 1855
Greek Revival architecture in Indiana
Italianate architecture in Indiana
Historic districts in Rush County, Indiana
National Register of Historic Places in Rush County, Indiana